Johanna Klara Eleonore "Hannelore" Kohl (née Renner; 7 March 1933 – 5 July 2001) was the first wife of German Chancellor Helmut Kohl. She met him for the first time at a school party in Ludwigshafen, Allied-occupied Germany in 1948, when she was 15 years old, and they became engaged in 1953. They were married from 1960 until her death in 2001, a span which included his entire political career. They were the parents of Walter Kohl and Peter Kohl.

As the first lady of Rhineland-Palatinate (1969–1976) and later as the wife of the Chancellor (1982–1998) she undertook official duties, and was engaged in philanthropic work. According to their sons she was an important adviser for her husband during his chancellorship, especially concerning the German reunification and in international relations. Her fluency in foreign languages aided her husband in personal diplomacy.

Life and work
Johanna Klara Eleonore Renner was born and christened in Berlin. Her father Wilhelm Renner who joined the Nazi Party (NSDAP) in 1933, became an engineer, business executive,  at Hugo Schneider AG and also headed the employment office that developed the anti-tank weapon . Later, she chose "Hannelore" to be used as her first name.

In the days following Germany's defeat in World War II, at the age of 12, Hannelore Kohl was "one of the girls battered and defiled by Stalin's soldiers", multiple times raped by multiple Soviet soldiers and then thrown out of a window. In addition to psychological trauma, the attacks left her with a fractured vertebra and back pain for the rest of her life.

Hannelore Kohl had trained as an interpreter of English and French, which she spoke fluently. She had to end her studies in 1952, when her father died, and worked for some years as a foreign-language secretary. She later utilized her fluency in English and French in personal diplomacy alongside her husband, who spoke no foreign languages.

On 5 July 2001, Hannelore was found dead at age 68 in her Ludwigshafen home. She had apparently died by suicide with an overdose of sleeping pills, after years of suffering from what she had claimed to be a very rare and painful photoallergy induced by an earlier penicillin treatment that had forced her to avoid practically all sunlight for years. Hannelore's biographer, cited "medical experts to support his theory that the bizarre light allergy of her later years may have been a psychosomatic reaction to the suppressed traumas of the war."

Kohl's collection of German-style cooking recipes,  (Culinary Journey through German Regions), was published in 1996.

Honours
 Bambi Award, 1985
 USO International Service Award of the United Service Organizations, 1987
 Order of Merit of Rhineland-Palatinate, 1988
 Honorary doctorate, University of Greifswald, 1995
 Knight Commander of the Order of Merit of the Federal Republic of Germany, 1999

Publications

Edited by

References 

1933 births
2001 suicides
Politicians from Berlin
Drug-related suicides in Germany
Spouses of chancellors of Germany
German politicians who committed suicide
Knights Commander of the Order of Merit of the Federal Republic of Germany
2001 deaths
Hannelore